{{Infobox album
| name       = Party Your Body
| type       = Studio album
| artist     = Stevie B
| cover      = File:StevieB_PartyYourBody.jpg
| alt        =
| released   = 1988<ref>[http://www.discogs.com/Stevie-B-Party-Your-Body/release/592175 Stevie B.- Party Your Body @Discogs.com] Retrieved 2-27-2010</ref>
| recorded   = 1987
| venue      =
| studio     =
| genre      = Freestyle, Dance
| length     = 39:46
| label      = LMR / BCM
| producer   = Stevie B, Tolga Katas, Herb Moelis
| prev_title =
| prev_year  =
| next_title = In My Eyes
| next_year  = 1989
| misc       = 
}}Party Your Body'' is the debut album from Miami, Florida-based freestyle/dance musician Stevie B.  Released in 1988, the album featured the title track, which was a big hit in the clubs, as well as the even more successful follow-up singles "Dreamin' of Love" and "Spring Love," the latter of which went to No. 5 on the dance chart and nearly cracked the top 40 on the U.S. pop chart.

Track listings

LMR Records
 "Party Your Body" – 4:32
 "I Need You" – 5:05
 "Stop The Love" – 4:56
 "Day N' Night" – 5:03
 "Dreamin' of Love" – 4:08
 "No More Tears" – 6:01
 "Spring Love" – 5:03
 "Baby I'm A Fool For Love" – 4:50

BCM Records
 "Spring Love" – 5:03
 "I Need You" – 5:05
 "Stop The Love" – 4:56
 "Day N' Night" – 5:03
 "Baby I'm A Fool For Love" – 4:50
 "Party Your Body" – 4:32
 "Dreamin' of Love" – 4:08
 "No More Tears" – 6:01

Certifications

Charts

References

1988 albums
Stevie B albums